A large and exceptionally rare late autumn season tornado outbreak occurred during the afternoon and evening hours of November 12, 2005 with the majority of them concentrated in central Iowa. One person was killed and there was extensive damage in several communities.

There were preliminary reports of as many as twenty tornadoes in Iowa, and 14 were later confirmed, including 12 in Iowa alone. It is the largest ever tornado outbreak in Iowa in November; and among the largest outbreaks that far north and west in the United States that late in the year. Only 23 confirmed tornadoes have been recorded in Iowa in November from 1950–2004. There were also many reports of very large hail and strong straight-line winds, starting in southeast South Dakota.

In addition, the tornado sirens sounded just before an Iowa State University Cyclones football game incurring an evacuation of the stadium. The tornado was visible from the stadium. The Iowa State Cyclones, named partly for a violent tornado in the early 20th century returned to the field and were victorious. Another tornado struck the actual ISU campus a couple months prior on September 8 with minor damage.

Confirmed tornadoes

See also
List of North American tornadoes and tornado outbreaks
Iowa tornado outbreak of July 2018 - A more prolific outbreak across Iowa that also spawned EF3 tornadoes.

References

External links
Iowans sort through tornado rubble (CNN)
Football fans flee tornado (CNN)
Preliminary storm reports summary (SPC)

F3 tornadoes
Tornadoes of 2005
Tornadoes in Arkansas
Tornadoes in Iowa
Tornadoes in Missouri
2005 natural disasters in the United States
November 2005 events in the United States